John Joseph O'Brien (1886 – 20 December 1939) was a New Zealand cricketer who played first-class cricket for Hawke's Bay from 1906 to 1921.

Jack O'Brien was a useful batsman and medium-fast bowler. His best performances came in the match against Wellington in 1919-20, when he took 4 for 56 and 5 for 55 opening the bowling and made 39 and 11 opening the batting, playing a leading part in Hawke's Bay's 52-run victory. It was Hawke's Bay's last first-class victory.

O'Brien later became an umpire. He umpired Hawke's Bay's match against the touring MCC team in 1935-36, and was president of the Hawke's Bay Cricket Umpires Association and vice-president of the Hawke's Bay Cricket Association. 

For 25 years he worked for the carrying company Messrs Barry Bros Ltd of Napier. He died aged 53 after a long illness.

References

External links

 Jack O'Brien at CricketArchive

1886 births
1939 deaths
New Zealand cricketers
Hawke's Bay cricketers